Trefeiddan Moor is a Site of Special Scientific Interest (or SSSI) in Pembrokeshire, South Wales. It has been designated as a Site of Special Scientific Interest since January 1966 in an attempt to protect its fragile biological elements.

Type
This site is designated due to its biological qualities. SSSIs in Wales have been notified for a total of 142 different animal species and 191 different plant species.

The pale dog violet (Viola lactea) is particularly dependent on the heathland whilst the pillwort, slender centaury and chamomile thrive on winter-wet disturbed ground near and on paths and tracks. Floating water plants need areas of open water at least ankle-deep in summer and without too much organic matter. Natural Resources Wales attempts to encourage these conditions.

See also
List of Sites of Special Scientific Interest in Pembrokeshire

References

External links
Natural Resources Wales website

Sites of Special Scientific Interest in Pembrokeshire